Thirn is a village and civil parish in the Hambleton District of North Yorkshire, England.

The hamlet of Thirn is mentioned in the Domesday Book, and the name derives from the Old English þyrne, meaning thorn-bush. Historically the hamlet was in the ecclesiastical parish of Thornton Watlass, in the wapentake of Hang East.

There is a former Wesleyan Chapel which is located on the road to Thornton Watlass, and a former public house (The Boot & Shoe).

References

Villages in North Yorkshire
Civil parishes in North Yorkshire